"Where's Johnny?" is the 55th episode of the HBO original series The Sopranos and the third of the show's fifth season. Written by Michael Caleo and directed by John Patterson, it originally aired on March 21, 2004. It is the only episode of the entire series in which Edie Falco does not appear.

Starring
 James Gandolfini as Tony Soprano
 Lorraine Bracco as Dr. Jennifer Melfi *
 Edie Falco as Carmela Soprano *
 Michael Imperioli as Christopher Moltisanti
 Dominic Chianese as Corrado Soprano, Jr. 
 Steven Van Zandt as Silvio Dante *
 Tony Sirico as Paulie Gualtieri
 Robert Iler as Anthony Soprano, Jr. 
 Jamie-Lynn DiScala as Meadow Soprano *
 Drea de Matteo as Adriana La Cerva
 Aida Turturro as Janice Soprano Baccalieri
 Steven R. Schirripa as Bobby Baccalieri
 Vincent Curatola as Johnny Sack
 John Ventimiglia as Artie Bucco
 Kathrine Narducci as Charmaine Bucco
 Steve Buscemi as Tony Blundetto

* = credit only

Guest starring

Synopsis
Sal Vitro, a gardener who has been working in a particular neighborhood for decades, is told by Feech that the neighborhood now belongs to his nephew, E. Gary La Manna. When Sal rebuffs him, Feech viciously attacks him and breaks his right arm before Tony B, who is with him, pulls him away, reminding him that he is on parole. Paulie learns about the assault and tells Sal that, for a few percentage points, he can put things right.

Paulie visits Feech at his bakery, his legitimate business, but Feech angrily tells him to get out. Paulie then finds Gary and his brother at work, assaults them both, then empties Gary's wallet; he orders Gary to give him a cut of his profits and to pay Sal's medical bills. In a sit-down, Tony rules that the neighborhood should be divided between Gary and Sal. When Paulie informs Sal, he tries to hide his disappointment. Paulie adds that he will have to provide free services at the homes of "some friends of ours," including Tony and Johnny, whose lawn is huge.

Tensions rise in New York as loan shark Lorraine Calluzzo and her boyfriend, Jason Evanina, collect debts and pass payments up to Little Carmine. They are attacked by three of Johnny's men: Phil Leotardo, his brother Billy, and Joey Peeps. Phil subjects Lorraine to a mock execution. She, Jason, and Angelo have a meeting with Tony and Junior. Tony recommends that the Lupertazzi family form a triumvirate composed of Johnny, Carmine, and Angelo. Angelo says he is semi-retired and just wants to enjoy his grandchildren.

Tony meets Johnny, telling him that Lorraine reached out to him. He raises the power-sharing idea from the previous meeting, framing it as Angelo’s idea. Johnny responds with contempt, accusing Tony of empowering Carmine during the dispute over the HUD scam. During a later sit-down with Johnny, Tony is accompanied by Christopher, who, despite Tony's instructions, intervenes. Johnny shouts at them and the sit-down fails.

Tony mends fences with Artie Bucco, who is still holding a grudge over the loan incident. He offers Artie one of the bedrooms in his mother's house since Artie has run into problems with his living arrangements; after some hesitation, he accepts.

Junior's dementia is gradually worsening. One afternoon, he wanders out in a bathrobe and slippers and drives to Bloomfield Avenue where his brother, Johnny Boy, once had a family hangout. It is now a storefront church and he is kicked out. Befuddled, Junior forgets where his car is parked and walks aimlessly. At night, two Newark policemen discover him and drive him home. Janice and Bobby discuss his condition with Tony. There is an argument: Janice slaps Tony and he starts choking her. As Bobby and Artie try to break up the fight, Artie gets hit in the eye by Janice's elbow. Janice runs out of the house crying. Junior's neurologist explains to Tony that his insults and erratic behavior may have been due to his infarcts (mini-strokes). Tony visits Junior and asks why he never says anything nice. "Don't you love me?" he asks. Junior doesn't answer, and they both quietly tear up.

First appearances
Sal Vitro: a gardener helped by Paulie who becomes indebted to the DiMeo crime family.
Billy Leotardo: Soldier in the Lupertazzi crime family and Phil's younger brother. He was seen along with Joey "Peeps" and Phil during Lorraine Calluzzo's mock execution.

Title reference
 Junior wanders away from his home looking for his brother, Johnny Soprano, and utters the question in the episode. It is also a pun on Ed McMahon's famous intro-lines for Johnny Carson, which had also been famously referenced in the horror film The Shining.

References to previous episodes
 In the pilot episode, when Tony describes Uncle Junior to Dr. Melfi, he says his uncle embarrassed him by telling all his girl cousins he didn't have the makings of a varsity athlete. Junior greatly annoys Tony by repeating this once again to the Sunday dinner guests in this episode.
 The audiobook that Paulie listens to in his car is The Art of War by Sun Tzu. Paulie's curiosity about Sun Tzu was brought up in the previous episode, "Rat Pack."

Cultural references
 Uncle Junior is seen watching the HBO television series Curb Your Enthusiasm (featuring a scene between Larry David and Jeff Garlin) and is confused because he thinks he's watching himself and Bobby on TV. The scene in question is from the season 2 episode "The Doll" (2001).
In another apparent reference to Curb Your Enthusiasm Bobby is wearing a shirt similar to one that features prominently in the season 3 episode "Chet's Shirt" (2002) when he visits Tony to ask for more responsibilities. 
 When Janice stops by her late mother's house to tell Tony about Uncle Junior, he's watching the 1940 movie His Girl Friday. The TV screen isn't seen, but a snippet of dialogue between Abner Biberman, who plays a small-time thug, and Rosalind Russell is heard: Hi, Hildy. / Oh, hello, Louie. How's the big slot-machine king? / Oh, I ain't doin' that no more; I'm retired.
 When Tom and Barbara Giglione arrive late for Sunday dinner they state that they were stuck in traffic at the Tappan Zee bridge because "they're checking the trucks again."  This is in reference to the regular and later intermittent inspection of trucks crossing the bridges and tunnels between New York and New Jersey as a precautionary measure after the September 11 attacks.
Tony and Johnny meet in the Shea Stadium parking lot in Queens. The stadium was home to the New York Mets from 1964 to 2008, before it was demolished in 2009 and replaced with Citi Field.
 When Adriana asks Agent Sanseverino how much longer she has to give her information, she mentions it took the RICO case of Joseph Massino seven years to build.

Music 
 The music played over the end credits is "Earth, Wind, Water" by Mitch Coodley, from The Metro Music Production Library.
 When Paulie meets with Sal Vitro to discuss Sal's problem with Feech, the song playing in the background at the bar is "Let Your Love Flow" by The Bellamy Brothers.
 When motivational speaker Tony Robbins is shown on television, the song playing is "Sirius" by the Alan Parsons Project.

References

External links
"Where's Johnny?"  at HBO

The Sopranos (season 5) episodes
2004 American television episodes
Television episodes directed by John Patterson (director)